The Japan national football team in 2011, managed by head coach Alberto Zaccheroni, began by competing and winning the 2011 AFC Asian Cup. The win meant Japan were crowned the Champions of Asia for a record 4th time and earned a berth in the 2013 FIFA Confederations Cup. The team would continue by competing in the 2011 Kirin Cup and the 2011 Copa América in amongst other international friendly matches before closing out 2011 by commencing in the third round of the 2014 FIFA World Cup qualification as they progress towards the 2014 FIFA World Cup.

Record

Kits

Schedule
2011 AFC Asian Cup Group B

2011 AFC Asian Cup Group B

2011 AFC Asian Cup Group B

2011 AFC Asian Cup Quarterfinals

2011 AFC Asian Cup Semifinals

2011 AFC Asian Cup Final

International Friendly (2011 Kirin Challenge Cup)

International Friendly (2011 Kirin Challenge Cup)

2011 Tōhoku earthquake Charity Match

2011 Kirin Cup

2011 Kirin Cup

2011 Copa América Group A

2011 Copa América Group A

2011 Copa América Group A

International Friendly (2011 Kirin Challenge Cup)

2014 FIFA World Cup qualification (AFC) Third Round

2014 FIFA World Cup qualification (AFC) Third Round

International Friendly (2011 Kirin Challenge Cup)

2014 FIFA World Cup qualification (AFC) Third Round

2014 FIFA World Cup qualification (AFC) Third Round

2014 FIFA World Cup qualification (AFC) Third Round

Player statistics

Goalscorers

References

External links
Japan Football Association

Japan national football team results
2011 in Japanese football
Japan